Iron Acton station opened on 2 September 1872, with the start of services on the Midland Railway branch from Yate to Thornbury. The station was designed by the Midland Railway company architect John Holloway Sanders.

It closed to passenger services on 19 June 1944.

The station served Iron Acton village and was sited to the south west of it. It consisted of a single platform face and a large wooden station building. A freight-only branch serving an iron mine in Frampton Cotterell connected at the station. This closed in 1872 and a truncated section of this route served as a coal depot until closure on 10 June 1963.

The station was demolished in the 1960s. The part-remains of the platform survive, as does a crossing-keeper's cottage to the south of the station site. In mid 2013, the line beyond Yate Middle Jn was placed 'Out of Use', due to the mothballing of the quarry at Tytherington. However the line has since reopened with the resumption of quarry traffic.

Services

Notes

References 
 
 

Former Midland Railway stations
Disused railway stations in Bristol, Bath and South Gloucestershire
Railway stations in Great Britain opened in 1872
Railway stations in Great Britain closed in 1944
John Holloway Sanders railway stations